The Nell Gwynne Tavern is a Grade II listed public house at 1–2 Bull Inn Court, Covent Garden, London, WC2.

It is an early 19th-century refronting or rebuild of a 17th-century/18th-century house.

References

Grade II listed pubs in the City of Westminster
Covent Garden